Mauro Raphael, also known as Maurinho (6 June 1933 – 28 June 1995) was a Brazilian football player. He played for Brazil national team in the 1954 FIFA World Cup.

References

1933 births
1995 deaths
People from Araraquara
Brazilian footballers
Brazilian expatriate footballers
Brazil international footballers
Boca Juniors footballers
Argentine Primera División players
Expatriate footballers in Argentina
1954 FIFA World Cup players
São Paulo FC players
Association football forwards
Footballers from São Paulo (state)